13th OTO Awards

SND, Bratislava, Slovakia

Overall winner  Marcel Merčiak

Hall of Fame  Magda Paveleková

Život Award  Marcel Merčiak

◄ 12th | 14th ►

The 13th OTO Awards, honoring the best in Slovak popular culture for the year 2012, took time and place on March 16, 2013 on the New  Opera stage of the Slovak National Theater in Bratislava. The ceremony broadcast live RTVS on Jednotka, the hosts of the show were Adela Banášová and Matej "Sajfa" Cifra.

Presenters

 Dušan Gabáni, sports commentator
 Juraj Lelkes, Kooperatíva representative
 Ladislav Lučenič, musician
 Václav Mika, RTVS general manager
 Tom Nicholson
 Lukáš Pavlásek, comedian
 Karol Polák, sports commentator
 Sisa Sklovská, singer
 Miroslav Žbirka, musician

Winners and nominees

Main categories
 Television

 Music

Others

Superlatives
In the main categories, Ján Mečiar and Marcel Merčiak received two simultaneous nominations, respectively. Merčiak scored one win, having also achieved two special awards as the first such recipient in the so far history of the poll.

Multiple nominees
 2 nominations
 Ján Mečiar
 Marcel Merčiak

Reception

TV ratings
The show has received a total audience of more than 587,000 viewers, making it the most watched television program within prime time in the region.

References

External links
 Archive > OTO 2012 – 13th edition  (Official website)
 Winners (at 24hod.sk)
 Winners and nominees (at Teraz.sk)
 Winners and nominees (at Hospodárske noviny)

OTO Awards
2012 in Slovak music
2012 in Slovak television
2012 television awards